Pseudanthias rubrizonatus, the red-belted anthias, liliac-tip basslet, deepsea fairy basslet, lilac-tipped seaperch, redband anthias,  red-band basslet or redbar anthias is a species of marine ray-finned fish, an anthias from the subfamily Anthiinae part of the family Serranidae, the groupers and sea basses. It is found in the Indo-Pacific. It occasionally makes its way into the aquarium trade. It grows to a size of 12 cm in length.

Description
Pseudanthias rubrizonatus males are pinkish to pinkish orange at the anterior end of the body and are frequently bright yellow on the posterior of the body and on the tail, these two areas being separated by a wide red, vertical bar. There is a lilac coloured stripe which runs from below the eye to the lower part of the base of the pectoral fin. The dorsal fin has a lilac margin as do the outer lobes of the caudal fin. The females are reddish-pink, paler ventrally, and each scale has a dark spot in it. The females also have a violet stripe from below the eye to the lower part of the base of the pectoral fin and have red tips to the lobes of the caudal fin. The juveniles show lavender tips to the spines in the dorsal fin. The dorsal fin contains 10 spines and 16 soft rays while the anal fin has 3 spines and 7 soft rays.

Distribution
Pseudanthias rubrizonatus is found in the Indo-Pacific where it occurs from the Andaman Sea east as far as Fiji, north to southern Japan and south to Australia and the Great Barrier Reef. In Australia it occurs as far south as Sydney, New South Wales.

Habitat and biology
The juvelines may be found in harbours and over silted coral reefs. It is a protogynous hermaphrodite and when the male dies or disappears the most dominant female changes into a male. They normally feed on zooplankton but are opportunistically piscivorous.

Taxonomy
Pseudanthias rubrizonatus was first formally described in 1983 as Anthias rubrizonatus by John E. Randall with the type locality given as the southwestern side of Savo Island in the Solomon Islands. This species is placed in the subgenus Pseudanthias by some authorities and it is similar in appearance to ''Pseudanthias connelli of South Africa.

Utilisation
This species appears in the aquarium trade.

References

rubrizonatus
Taxa named by John Ernest Randall
Fish described in 1983